Halobaculum gomorrense is a rod-shaped extremely halophilic archaeon first isolated from the Dead Sea.

References

Further reading
Guerrero, Ricardo. "Halophiles and hypersaline environments. Current research and future trends." International Microbiology 16.1 (2013): 65–66.
Seckbach, Joseph, ed. Enigmatic microorganisms and life in extreme environments. Vol. 1. Springer, 2003.
Oren, Aharon. Microbiology and biogeochemistry of hypersaline environments. Vol. 5. CRC Press, 1998.
Oren, Aharon. Halophilic microorganisms and their environments. Vol. 5. Springer, 2002.

External links
Type strain of Halobaculum gomorrense at BacDive -  the Bacterial Diversity Metadatabase

Euryarchaeota
Archaea described in 1995